Peter Hacker is a philosopher.

Peter Hacker may also refer to:

Peter Hacker (cricketer) (born 1952), English cricketer
Peter Hacker, character in The Ambassador